Yury Ilyich Skuratov (born 3 July 1952) is a Russian jurist and politician.

Skuratov was born in Ulan-Ude. From 1995 until 1999, he was Prosecutor General of Russia. In February 1999, he disclosed the existence of FIMACO.

Supported with an audit of the financial and economic activities of the office of the Prosecutor General of Russia which was investigated by Nikolai Yemelyanov, Skuratov spearheaded a corruption investigation into the former acting Prosecutor General of Russia Alexey Ilyushenko (b. 23 September 1957, Anzhero-Sudzhensk, Kemerovo Oblast, Soviet Union) and his friend Pyotr Yanchev. Ilyushenko was forced to resign on 8 October 1995 because of a 97 volume indictment on him involving the theft of 25 million tons of Russian oil, which was worth 2.7 billion rubles, from the Balkar Trading company which was formed in Balashikha, was one of the largest Russian oil traders in the early to mid 1990s and was in competition with Boris Berezovsky's interests. BAM-Credit, which had Balkar Trading accounts, was the dominant financier of gold mining in the Irkutsk and Magadan regions. Because of a Swiss criminal investigation, the Geneva investigator S. Esposito froze the Swiss accounts of Balkar Trading's Swiss branch known as "Balcar Trading Sari", which was a 28 June 1994 established shell company owned by both his wife Tatiana Vladimirovna Ilyushenko, who was also an attorney for the Balkar Bank, and Pyotr Golovinov (b. 1968 or 1969) who was Yanchev's right-hand man and organized the movement of the foreign assets of Balkar Trading, BAM-Credit, and the Russian House of Selenga (RDS) to the Swiss firm "Balcar Trading Sari". On 1 November 1996, the Geneva Prosecutor indictments upheld the frozen Swiss accounts and Ilyushenko was detained in a pre trial jail for the next two years. However, on 11 May 2001, these charges on Alexey Ilyushenko and his friend Pyotr Yanchev, who was the head of Balkar Trading, were dropped by Vladimir Ustinov.

In the late 1990s, Skuratov and Carla Del Ponte with Filipe Turover providing evidence investigated Russian corruption involving high ranking Russian officials. Earlier, both Italian and German Tax officials had started investigations into corrupt Russian officials. Felipe Turover Chudínov, a senior intelligence officer with the foreign-intelligence directorate of the KGB, alleged that $15 billion of IMF funds had been funneled through Switzerland, Lichtenstein and Caribbean countries as black cash or obschak to support Kremlin friendly operations and companies.

In April 1999, then FSB Chief Vladimir Putin and Interior Minister Sergei Stepashin held a televised press conference in which they discussed a video that both Mikhail Shvydkoy and Mikhail Lesin agreed to release and that had aired nationwide on 17 March on the state-controlled RTR channel which showed a naked man very similar to Skuratov, in bed with two young women. This video was released after he had been investigating numerous corrupt officials including Alexander Mamut and both Pavel Borodin and Vladimir Putin and had begun looking into charges of corruption by President Boris Yeltsin and his associates: the video was said to serve as kompromat. Skuratov's dismissal occurred just days before a second search of the owner of Mabetex the Albanian businessman Behgjet Pacolli linked interests during an ongoing money laundering investigation which had begun in 1992 in Bern involving Pacolli and Yakutiya officials involved in gold and diamonds especially the Mayor of Yakutsk Pavel Pavlovich Borodin who was Putin's architect for the transfer of the Presidential Property Management Department assets to LLCs, JSCs, and Joint Ventures during early 1997.

In early 2000, Filipe Turover sent messages from his Swiss residence to Moscow prosecutors "I'm ready to talk about Putin. Always your Turover." The Russian prosecutor Ruslan Tamaev headed the Russian investigations into Mabetex which ended when his half brothers Hasan and Hussein were charged with illegal possession of drugs and weapons and he was subsequently removed from investigations. A few months later the charges against his half brothers were dropped.

In April 2000, Skuratov was fired as chief prosecutor after serving a suspension for accusing top officials of corruption.

2000 presidential campaign
In 2000, Skuratov ran in the Russian presidential elections.

Skuratov's campaign largely ran advertisements intended to remediate the damage inflicted to his reputation by the video which had been released in 1999. These ads portrayed him as a decent family man and a faithful husband who had been the victim of "lies" and "fabrications".

In the limited coverage he was allotted, Russian media treated him as a sideshow rather than as a serious contender for the presidency.

Notes

References

Books

External links

Persons – NUPI, biography from the Norwegian Centre for Russian Studies
Yury Skuratov, The Moscow Times, 22 March 2000. 

1952 births
Living people
People from Ulan-Ude
Communist Party of the Russian Federation members
Candidates in the 2000 Russian presidential election
General Prosecutors of Russia
20th-century Russian lawyers
21st-century Russian lawyers
20th-century Russian politicians
21st-century Russian politicians
Ural State Law University alumni